The Remington 788 is a bolt-action, centerfire rifle that was made by Remington Arms from 1967 to 1983. It was marketed as an inexpensive yet accurate hunting rifle to compete with other gun companies' less expensive rifles alongside their more expensive Model 700 line.  The 788 utilizes a single-column detachable magazine holding 3 rounds.  A .22 rimfire model was also produced known as the 580, 581, or 582 depending on its method of feed.  A target version of the .22 caliber 58x series, the 540X, was used by the US military as a training rifle and later disposed through the Civilian Marksmanship Program.

Design

The Remington 788 has two distinguishing design features.  The first is the rear-lugged bolt.  The bolt has nine lugs in three rows of three lugs each.  They lock into the receiver behind the magazine well.  Due to this design, the bolt handle lifts only 60 degrees on opening giving more clearance for scopes compared to the 90 degrees required for the Model 700 and other two-lug rifles.  The bolt travel is also reduced because of the rear lugs.  The bolt pictured is a pre-1975 locking model from a .308 Winchester caliber rifle.  The locking bolt requires the safety to be in the "fire" or "off" position in order to rotate the handle and actuate the bolt.  Rifles manufactured from 1975 to 1983 have non-locking bolts which can be actuated while the safety is engaged.  The second distinguishing feature is the receiver.  It has a smaller ejection port than similar bolt-action rifles, and no bolt lug raceways.  The single stack magazine design yields a smaller feed opening in the bottom of the receiver compared to rifles using a double stack magazine well.  When machining of these smaller ports is complete there is more steel remaining in the receiver between the ejection port and adjacent feed port, and significantly more steel overall where all receivers have the least strength.  These characteristics combined to make the Remington 788 receiver more rigid and stronger than most, if not all, competing designs, including the Remington 700 which shares the same outside receiver diameter.  A rifle's accuracy tends to increase slightly as the rigidity of the receiver increases, as this slightly reduces barrel deflection during firing.  Thus the Remington 788 has the structural foundation to be a very accurate rifle.

Variants

A left-handed version was produced in .308 and 6mm Remington calibers. The Carbine version with an  barrel was produced in .308 Winchester, 7mm-08, and .243. The stock was revised in 1980 being the only significant change throughout the production history.  The following table presents a breakdown of this rifle's 15 year production run by caliber, year, and configuration.

References

.44 Magnum firearms
Bolt-action rifles of the United States
Remington Arms firearms